Mimetus bifurcatus is a species of Araneomorphae spider in the family of Mimetidae.

Distribution
This species is endemic to Costa Rica.

Original publications
 Reimoser, 1939 : Wissenschaftliche Ergebnisse der österreichischen biologischen Expedition nach Costa Rica. Die Spinnenfauna. Annalen des Naturhistorischen Museums in Wien,

References

External links
 
 

Mimetidae
Endemic fauna of Costa Rica
Spiders described in 1939